Lophocampa aenone is a moth of the family Erebidae. It was described by Arthur Gardiner Butler in 1878. It is found in Brazil, Suriname, Venezuela and Ecuador.

Description
Primaries above semitransparent whitey brown, crossed by wavy grey lines much as in the preceding species, but with no oblique central line; a more or less marked blackish spot at the inferior extremity of the cell; secondaries hyaline white; thorax brown, abdomen creamy white; primaries below less strongly marked than above; body sordid white: expanse, M 1 inch 2 lines; F 1 inch 4 lines.

References

 

aenone
Moths described in 1878